Maritime Industrial Services Co. Ltd. Inc.

The MIS Group (Maritime Industrial Services), is a diversified engineering and contracting group providing a broad range of products and services to the energy sector. It was established in Dubai, UAE in 1979. MIS trades on the Oslo Stock Exchange's main list under the ticker symbol MIS.

MIS’ business scope covers EPC, Fabrication, New Build, Rig Refurb, Tech Services (Operations & Maintenance) and Safety Services.

MIS’ operational scope of work covers engineering, procurement, fabrication, construction, safety, operating and maintenance services to the oil, gas, petrochemical, energy, power generation and marine industries.

History

1979: Foundation of MIS
1985: Relocation from Dubai to Sharjah yard and start of pressure vessel manufacture
1985: Acquisition of Sunbelt Safety division
1990: EPC start up
2001: MIS Arabia joint venture
2006: First New Build contract signed
2007: MIS listing on the Oslo Børs stock exchange
2008: Acquisition of Rig Metals (onshore rig components)
2009: Delivery of the first rig in the Middle East and the launch of EPI
2010: Start-up of Production Services, the acquisition of Litwin PEL, and MOU with Kavin Engineering
2012: Acquisition by Lamprell PLC

Business Activities
MIS’ business is based around six main value streams (business activities) but since 2008 has gained 4 more as acquisitions and start-ups.

Main Value Streams

Fabrication
EPC
New Build
Refurb
Tech Services
Sunbelt Safety

Acquisitions and Start-ups
Rig Metals: Rig Metals LLC was acquired by MIS in 2008. It has ten years’ experience in the region providing oilfield related engineering and steel fabrication contracting services to the offshore and onshore rig industry.
EPI: was launched in 2010 and focuses on EPC and EPCM projects in markets such as Abu Dhabi, Saudi Arabia, Qatar, and Oman
Production Services: was established in 2010. It will be focusing on the provision of oil & gas production equipment and services for both onshore and offshore developments
Litwin PEL: was acquired by MIS in September 2010. It is an Abu Dhabi-based EPC and Engineering Services company catering to the Middle East and Africa Oil and Gas sector.
Acquisition of MIS: MIS was acquired by Lamprell plc in 2012. Lamprell, based in the United Arab Emirates (“UAE”), and with operations throughout the region, has played a prominent role in the development of the offshore industry in the Persian Gulf for over 30 years and is the regional market leader in the rig market. Lamprell is a leading provider of diversified engineering and contracting services to the onshore and offshore oil & gas and renewable energy industries.

Operations
The company's operations span several markets: Sharjah UAE where the company has 200,000 m2 quayside facilities in Port Khalid; Kuwait, Qatar and Saudi Arabia under the name MIS Arabia (a joint venture). MIS’ geographical footprint also covers Egypt, Kazakhstan and Iraq.

References

External links 
  MIS Website
 Rig Metals Website
 Litwin PEL Website
 Lamprell plc Website

Engineering companies of the United Arab Emirates